Michael Louis "Mike" Corbat (born May 2, 1960) is an American banker who served as the chief executive officer of Citigroup from 2012 to 2021. His 2012 welcome from The New York Times described him as a "Jack-of-All-Trades".

Early life and education
Born  in Bristol, Connecticut, Corbat graduated from Harvard University in 1983 with a Bachelor of Arts degree in economics, where he also played offensive guard for the school's football team. He was two-time all Ivy League and was selected as first team College Football All-America Team in NCAA Division I-AA in 1982. He was the first Harvard player to be selected since Dan Jiggetts in 1975.

Career
Corbat worked at Citi or its predecessor companies for his entire career, starting with Salomon Brothers. 

He served as Head of Citi's Global Corporate Bank and Global Commercial Bank and CEO of Citi's Global Wealth Management (consisting of Smith Barney and the Citi Private Bank). As CEO of Citi Holdings, he was responsible for and led the divestiture of a portfolio of non-core business and assets following the financial crisis of 2008 and Citi's participation in the Troubled Asset Relief Program (TARP).

In 2011, he was named CEO of Europe, Middle East and Africa (EMEA) where he oversaw all Citi operations in the region. In October 2012, Mike Corbat was appointed CEO of Citi after Vikram Pandit's resignation.

In September 2020, Citigroup announced Corbat's retirement, to be effective in February 2021. Jane Fraser was appointed to assume as CEO after Corbat, becoming the First Female CEO of a Top-Tier Investment Bank.

Issues addressed
In 2018 The New York Times wrote that "where Mr. Corbat can steer Citigroup directly, he is doing so." The issues he addressed included:
 Gender pay gap which he both defended, proclaiming that it inspires entry-level employee to work harder and advance, and concurrently described as "a challenge we need to tackle together."
 Bricks and Clicks, which Fortune Magazine described as "a broad physical branch network that caters to Baby Boomers and a robust online (and mobile) presence for Generation X and Millennials."

Leaving Citi
Corbat's annual salary was cut, as he was on his way out.

Personal life
Corbat is an enthusiastic fly fisherman, golfer and downhill skier who self-describes as "an avid outdoorsman and responsible gun owner." He serves on the Citigroup Board of Directors, the EMI Board of Directors, BritishAmerican Business Board of Directors and the U.S. Ski and Snowboard Team Foundation Board of Trustees. He has a wife : Donna; as well as two children: Brian and Allison.

References 

American chief executives of financial services companies
Citigroup employees
Harvard Crimson football players
Harvard University alumni
Living people
People from Bristol, Connecticut
1960 births